Dunglegang Gewog (Dzongkha: དུང་ལ་སྒང་) is a gewog (village block) of Tsirang District, Bhutan.

References 

Gewogs of Bhutan
Tsirang District